Álvaro García Cantó (born 7 July 1986 in La Romana, Alicante, Valencian Community) is a Spanish former professional footballer who played as a left winger.

External links

Stats and bio at Cadistas1910 

1986 births
Living people
People from Vinalopó Mitjà
Sportspeople from the Province of Alicante
Spanish footballers
Footballers from the Valencian Community
Association football wingers
Segunda División players
Segunda División B players
Tercera División players
Divisiones Regionales de Fútbol players
Alicante CF footballers
Cádiz CF players
Racing de Ferrol footballers
UD Alzira footballers
Novelda CF players
CD Alcoyano footballers
FC Cartagena footballers
CD Leganés players
Huracán Valencia CF players
Hércules CF players
CF Intercity players
Super League Greece players
Asteras Tripolis F.C. players
Spanish expatriate footballers
Expatriate footballers in Greece
Spanish expatriate sportspeople in Greece